James Gemmell (born April 26, 1980) is a Canadian ice sledge hockey player.

Gemmell was born in 100 Mile House, British Columbia and lists his hometown as Quesnel, British Columbia. In 2004, he had his right leg amputated above the knee after an automobile accident. He began playing sledge hockey in 2006 with the Surrey Eagles.

Gemmell won a gold medal with Team Canada at the 2013 IPC Ice Sledge Hockey World Championships in Goyang, Korea, and a bronze medal at the 2014 Winter Paralympics in Sochi, Russia.

References

External links 
 
 

1980 births
Living people
Canadian sledge hockey players
Paralympic sledge hockey players of Canada
Paralympic bronze medalists for Canada
Ice sledge hockey players at the 2010 Winter Paralympics
Ice sledge hockey players at the 2014 Winter Paralympics
Medalists at the 2014 Winter Paralympics
Medalists at the 2018 Winter Paralympics
Paralympic medalists in sledge hockey